The Secret Jewel Box is a ten-CD box set, a collection of music by guitarist Steve Vai, released in 2001. Vai's website describes it as "not a compilation of Vai's catalog, but rather something far more conceptual. The series includes soundtracks, rarities, outtakes and oddities, out of print albums, Vai’s recordings with Frank Zappa and with early bands Alcatrazz and The Classified, acoustic piano interpretations of Vai songs, even an eclectic audio art project."

The box and the first three CDs were released in 2001, with only 10,000 boxes having been manufactured. Those who purchased the box were to be notified when the remaining CDs were ready. The 100-page booklet was to be sent out to those who had collected all 10 CDs after the last CD was produced. It was 13 years between the release of Disc 6 (2004) and Disc 7 (2017).

Content

Production
Producer – Eddie Kramer (tracks: 2-1 to 2-11)
Engineer, Mixed By – Eddie Kramer (tracks: 2-1 to 2-11), John Begoshian (tracks: 2-1 to 2-11), Paul Levy (tracks: 2-1 to 2-11)
Engineer [Assisted By], Mixed By [Assisted By] – Brian Leshon (tracks: 2-1 to 2-11), Brian Scheuble (tracks: 2-1 to 2-11), Mark Wilczak (tracks: 2-1 to 2-11), Paul Lani (tracks: 2-1 to 2-11), Ross Stien (tracks: 2-1 to 2-11)
Mastered By – George Marino (tracks: 2-1 to 2-11), Neil Citron (tracks: 1-1 to 1-40), Steve Vai (tracks: 1-1 to 1-40)
Photography [2nd Disc Logo] – Steve Crise
Photography [2nd Disc] – Ron Slenzak
Written-By, Composed By, Producer, Arranged By, Performer – Frank Zappa (tracks: 3-1 to 3-17)
Arranged By – Steve Vai (tracks: 2-1 to 2-11)
Artwork By [1st Disc] – Steve Vai
Artwork By [2nd Disc Design] – Dyer/Kahn, Inc., Tim Owens
Artwork By [2nd Disc Metal Logo Sculpture] – Nicholas Fasciano
Artwork By [3rd Disc Art Direction] – Ciruelo Cabral, Gail Zappa, Priscila Bara, Steve Vai

References

External links
 "The Secret Jewel Box at Discogs.com
 Vai.com

Steve Vai albums
2001 compilation albums
Progressive rock compilation albums
Hard rock compilation albums
Instrumental rock compilation albums